RTD info was a quarterly magazine published by the European Commission presenting a mix of research results and debate on scientific subjects of interest to a wide, non-specialised readership. In 2007 the decision was made to change the name to research*eu. It lasted 63 issues, which are still available  as pdf files. The common theme was Europe.

RTD info was published by  the Communication Unit of the Research DG on paper in English, French (RDT info) and German (FTE info), and on the internet in these languages plus Spanish (I+DT info). When the name was changed to research*eu, a Spanish translation was also printed. The magazine had its headquarters in Brussels. Michel Claessens served as the editor-in-chief of the magazine.

References

External links
 

Defunct magazines published in Belgium
Magazines with year of establishment missing
Magazines with year of disestablishment missing
Magazines published in Brussels
Science and technology magazines
Quarterly magazines